Sami Taha (1916 – September 12, 1947) was the main Palestine Arab labor leader in Palestine during the British rule.

Early life
Taha was born in Arraba in 1916, a town near Jenin. He had completed primary school but, through independent study, he became fluent in English and acquired a good knowledge of labour law. His family later moved to Haifa, where he lived during his teenage years, in the early 1930s. There he came to the attention of a very influential man in the city named Rashid al-Haj Ibrahim, who employed Taha to work in the Arab Chamber of Commerce. In 1937, during the 1936–39 Arab revolt in Palestine, he was detained by British forces for six months without trial under the Defence (Emergency) Regulations.

Labor leader
Taha became important figure in Palestine and the leader of the Palestinian Arab labor movement after organizing an Arab labor movement similar to the Jewish Histadrut. Taha joined the Palestine Arab Workers Society (PAWS) — which was established in 1925 — where he was employed as a low level clerk then a secretary. He worked his way up the organization and in 1937, he was appointed its general-secretary.

Taha, conservative in policies, and was rivaled by the left or communist-leaning factions of the PAWS. By his late twenties, Taha dominated PAWS by being its spokesman and worked to enlarge the organization in membership and stature. In 1944, Arab and Jewish workers went on strike in Haifa led by PAWS and the Histadrut. The strike was favored by the leftist factions of PAWS, but Taha, not interested in a long politically risky strike, vouched for Arab workers to end it.

In 1946, Jamal al-Husayni appointed Taha as the labour representative of the Arab Higher Committee (AHC). Tensions between Taha and the al-Husayni members and loyalists in the AHC who dominated that organization became increasingly high in 1947 as the Husaynis became angered at Taha's refusal to obey AHC demands. Some of these deviations included Taha's refusal to allow the PAWS to endorse a day-long strike called by the AHC to protest the anniversary of the 1917 Balfour Declaration, as well as the PAWS adoption of socialist guiding principle going against the communist-led AHC. Taha was also accused of willing to compromise with the Jews and was perceived as "not anti-Zionist and anti-British enough." By August 1947, newspapers politically aligned with the AHC began publishing these and other allegations against Taha.

On September 12, 1947, Taha was assassinated outside his Haifa home. The assailant was not apprehended, but it is known that he was killed on the orders of Haj Amin al-Husseini, the Grand Mufti of Jerusalem and leader of the Palestine Arab Party.

References

Bibliography

External links
 A list of documents which mention or discuss this person

1916 births
1947 deaths
People from Arraba, Jenin
Arab people in Mandatory Palestine
Assassinated Palestinian politicians